

Lepidopterism is an irritant contact dermatitis caused by irritating caterpillar or moth hairs coming into contact with the skin or mucosa. When referring to the cause, moth dermatitis and caterpillar dermatitis are commonly used; Caripito itch (known as papillonite in French) is an older name referring to the moth dermatitis caused by some Hylesia species.

See also
 Millipede burn
 List of cutaneous conditions

References

Further reading

External links
 Caterpillar envenomation on eMedicine

Parasitic infestations, stings, and bites of the skin